Imsland Church is a parish church of the Church of Norway in Vindafjord Municipality in Rogaland county, Norway. It is located in the village of Imslandsjøen. It is the church for the Imsland parish which is part of the Haugaland prosti (deanery) in the Diocese of Stavanger. The white, wooden church was built in a long church style in 1861 using designs by the architect Hans Linstow. The church seats about 260 people.

History
The earliest existing historical records of the church date back to the year 1620, but it was not new that year. The original church at Imsland was a stave church, located slightly to the southwest of the present church site. In the 1670s, the church had structural problems and started to collapse, so it was torn down and replaced by a small timber-framed church on the same site. The following year, the old church was torn down and its materials were sold at auction.

See also
List of churches in Rogaland

References

Vindafjord
Churches in Rogaland
Wooden churches in Norway
19th-century Church of Norway church buildings
Churches completed in 1861
13th-century establishments in Norway